The following is a list of footballers who have scored at least 200 domestic league goals in Scottish league football. This includes the appearances and goals of former players, in the following domestic league competitions only:

  Scottish Premier League (1998–2013), Scottish Football League (1890–2013), Scottish Professional Football League (2013–present)

Due to the close connections between English and Scottish football, several players have played for clubs in Scotland and in the English Football League and/or Premier League and amassed over 200 goals across the two systems, including David McLean (over 160 goals in both), Joe Baker (over 140 in both), Neil Martin (over 110 in both) and Kenny Dalglish (over 110 in both).

List of players
Bold = All goals scored in top division.

Notes

See also
List of footballers in England by number of league appearances
List of footballers in Scotland by number of league appearances
List of footballers in England by number of league goals

References

Scotland
Football
Football records and statistics in Scotland
Scottish Football League
Association football in Scotland lists